Black Swan is the name of two supervillains appearing in American comic books published by Marvel Comics.

Publication history

Black swan (mutant)
The first Black Swan appeared in Deadpool #65 and was created by Gail Simone and the artists of Udon Studios.

Yabbat Ummon Turru
The second Black Swan first appeared in New Avengers vol. 3 #1 and was created by Jonathan Hickman and Steve Epting.

Fictional character biographies

Black Swan (mutant)

The first Black Swan appeared in Deadpool #65 and was created by Gail Simone and the artists of Udon Studios.

Black Swan is a German mutant raised in the Bavarian circus and highly trained in hand-to-hand, swordplay and gunmanship. He utilized his ability to infect the minds of others with disruptive "telepathic viruses" to become a successful mercenary and hit man, which brought him into conflict with the Taskmaster. He carried out an assassination on the four heads of the Japanese Four Winds crime families and organisation in New York, but although he carried it out surreptitiously, the credit was given to rival contractor Deadpool, who crashed through a skylight above the Four Winds at the same time, while firing wildly and in fact unknowingly missed the targets. When Deadpool was subsequently hired to kill Black Swan in Germany, the assassin beat Deadpool senseless, infected his mind with a mental "virus", and brought him to the U.S., having him brutally beaten every few minutes to prevent him from fully healing.

Swan attempted to use his operative, Nijo, a brother of one of the Four Winds, to torment Deadpool further, saying that letting Deadpool live with diminished capacity would be a greater humiliation than killing him. Once Taskmaster identified the Swan to Deadpool, the merc with a mouth traveled to the Swan's castle in Germany for a final showdown. When Nijo tried to kill Deadpool, claiming a personal vendetta against him, Black Swan impaled him with a sword-cane and fought Deadpool both physically and mentally, though he lost and was thrown face first into the white hot griddle of his own fireplace. A bomb Deadpool had brought as insurance went off before Deadpool could disarm it, destroying Black Swan's castle.

Apparently Black Swan was able to use his powers to in some way absorb traits from both Deadpool and Nijo in order to survive, resulting in the three of them sharing aspects of each other's powers, knowledge and personalities. The modified Nijo would become Agent X, while Black Swan was rescued by a Portuguese fishing boat, and Deadpool was rendered temporarily amnesiac. The three were reunited, along with Taskmaster and Sandi Brandenburg, and Black Swan demanded the return of his personality and abilities, for which he required Agent X's help, proposing a three-way mindmeld to restore each man.

Black Swan, however, double-crossed the others and absorbed both their powers, enhancing his own abilities to a tremendous level. Agent X, having anticipated treachery, had called upon a small army of heavily armed mercenaries to surround the area, but they proved no match for Black Swan's newly augmented telepathy and were quickly incapacitated. Together with the mercenary called Outlaw, Deadpool, Agent X, and Taskmaster were able to overwhelm Black Swan's healing ability and kill him. To be on the safe side, they had his body stuffed by a taxidermist so that he could not regenerate.

Recently, he was revealed to still be alive and whole again (possibly due to Deadpool's healing factor) and was hired by the mutant Black Box (who like Black Swan, had just been revealed to still be alive, after long being thought killed) to kill a now-depowered Deadpool (who like Black Swan, had been similarly restored to a normal appearance). However, after Deadpool chose to spare Black Swan's life by taking him to a hospital after defeating him with life-threatening injuries, Black Swan repaid the favor and saved Deadpool from being killed by the ex-mutant Black Tom, who had been hired by Black Box as they both had grudges against Deadpool. Black Swan then used his powers to make Black Box and Black Tom forget Deadpool had ever lost his healing factor, so they would stop trying to come after him again. Black Swan even proposed to team up with Deadpool, who was forced to grudgingly accept as he needed allies in his current condition.

Black Swan (Yabbat Ummon Turru)

Yabbat Ummon Turru first appeared in New Avengers vol. 3 #1 and was created by Jonathan Hickman and Steve Epting.

Yabbat Ummon Tarru was a princess on Earth-1365 and became its lone survivor. When she was four years old, her earth was involved in an incursion event, where two universes are colliding with each other at the focal point of their Earths. A race of beings called Black Priests came from the parallel Earth, intent on destroying her Earth to save their own universe and killing anyone who stood in their way. She fled into the Library of Worlds, a way station of the multiverse. There she was met by three Black Swans (female beings each of a different appearance) who took her in and raised her to be a Black Swan.

This new Black Swan came to Earth-616 when it experienced its first incursion event. She was intent on destroying Earth in order to save both universes involved in the incursion. Black Panther tries to stop her but fails when she successfully triggers an anti-matter injection device, but she then destroys the Earth she came from instead of Earth-616. She is then captured by Black Panther and imprisoned below Necropolis, The City of the Dead in Wakanda. Mister Fantastic is chosen to interrogate the Black Swan. While she seems cold and ruthless, she is seen via security camera weeping and crying out for help when sleeping. Though she is straightforward with her answers, they seem cryptic and like superstitious nonsense. She constantly warns that worse things are coming, and they need to prepare, but no matter what they do it's only delaying the inevitable because in the end everything dies. It was also revealed that Black Swan has a hatred toward Doctor Strange and magic users in general, being unwilling to tolerate Doctor Strange even talking to her, once he had told her he is a master of the mystic arts and the Sorcerer Supreme. This may be because her original Earth was destroyed by the Black Priests who appear to be magic users wearing helmets with one large eye on them, resembling the Eye of Agamotto.

After the Illuminati try to deal with the next two incursions that occur on their own, they succeed only through luck, and seek help from the Black Swan, who shows she had the strength to break out of her jail cell all along. She is willing to help them for a price, which is her own life, and in helping them, she helps herself for the moment. She gives them her history and the only method of permanently stopping incursions into their universe to destroy their Earth. As a sign of her good faith, she also gives them the scientific knowledge to make a device to forecast upcoming incursions, where as up until then, their technology could only detect incursions as they occur; her own such devices are implanted in her eyes. The Illuminati also reverse-engineer her anti-matter injection bomb, which they use to stop the next incursion. Black Swan is later placed in a cell where she has the Terrax of Earth-13054 as a cellmate. Both of them form an alliance where they will use each other's talents for the coming days.

During the Infinity storyline, Thanos finds the Illuminati's base. While looking for the Infinity Gems, Thanos stumbles upon the cell of Black Swan and Terrax of Earth-13054. When both of them ask for Thanos to free them in exchange for being one of his lieutenants, Thanos declined and left. Following the defeat of both Thanos and the Builders, Black Swan told the Illuminati that the threat of the Builders was nothing compared to the other forces that are out there. Black Swan then instructed the Illuminati to build the Bridge which revealed to the Illuminati the past actions of Black Swan on other Earths. Upon the Illuminati re-imprisoning Black Swan, Terrax of Earth-13054 later pointed to Thanos' cell where Black Swan sees that Black Order member Corvus Glaive is slowly reviving.

After Namor was kicked out of the Illuminati, he released Thanos, Proxima Midnight, Corvus Glaive, Black Swan, and Terrax of Earth-13054 in order to form his incarnation of the Cabal. They made plans to do what the Illuminati didn't want to do and that was destroy the worlds that were in the incursions.

During the Time Runs Out storyline, Black Swan was with the Cabal claimed the ruins at Wakanda as their base and started destroying worlds that would be a threat to Earth-616 during the incursions. Black Swan started to know about Namor's wavering dedication and even taunted him. Black Swan informed the rest of the Cabal of an unusual event. As they were unable to return to Earth-616 upon being left on the unidentified Earth, the Cabal headed to Earth-1610. When Black Swan became aware of Namor's treachery, she confronted Namor, who stated that survival is the only thing he cares about now. Black Swan decides not to tell the rest of the Cabal about Namor's secret.

During the Secret Wars storyline, Black Swan and the rest of the Cabal worked with Maker into making a life-raft that would save them from the final incursion involving Earth-616 and Earth-1610 where it was deployed during the fight between both its inhabitants. Following the final incursion, Black Swan and the Cabal awoke in their life-raft when it landed on the patchwork planet called Battleworld. While Black Swan and the Cabal were fighting the Thor Corps, Sheriff Strange released the survivors of Earth-616 from their life-raft in hopes that they would confront the Cabal. Upon being teleported to Doomgard by Sheriff Strange, Black Swan was confronted by God Emperor Doom and ended up serving him. Black Swan was with God Emperor Doom's family when it came to the battle between Battleworld's inhabitants and God Emperor Doom's forces. When Black Swan confronted Star-Lord near the World Tree and defeated him, she was caught by surprise when Star-Lord managed to turn the World Tree into Groot, who defeated her.

Thanos later recruited Black Swan and Proxima Midnight to join his second incarnation of the Black Order. He then dispatched them to Collector's ship to obtain the Mjolnir of Earth-1610. Black Swan, Proxima Midnight, and the unidentified cloaked ally of Thanos snuck onto Collector's ship where they had an encounter with Thor Odinson and Beta Ray Bill. After Beta Ray Bill had been knocked out by Thor Odinson who was suffering from warrior madness, Black Swan and Proxima Midnight tried to target Stormbreaker only for the cloaked figure to tell them that Stormbreaker is not their target. The three of them continued to search Collector's ship where they find the City of Asgard, which is where the Mjolnir of Earth-1610 is located. When Black Swan and Proxima Midnight attacked Collector, they were struck by an energy blast emitted from the Mjolnir of Earth-1610.

During the "No Surrender" arc, Black Swan appeared as a member of Challenger's Black Order. The group took part in a contest against Grandmaster's Lethal Legion.

Powers and abilities

Black Swan (mutant)
The first Black Swan has the ability to implant a telepathic virus in the minds of others which disrupts the natural functions of their brains to cut off access to and override motor coordination, disorient their concentration, etc.

Yabbat Ummon Turru
The second Black Swan is very knowledgeable about the incursions and the multiverse, and has the ability to speak in multiple languages, including some of Earth's oldest languages, knowledge she has gleaned traveling between alternate Earths. She has access to advanced technology including anti-matter devices and ocular implants that forecast upcoming incursions and allow her to see incursion walls (which are invisible to the naked eye until something passes through them). She has displayed multiple powers including energy beams from her eyes, flight, super strength, the ability to generate holographic visuals from her hands, and also telepathy which she has kept hidden from the Illuminati and uses to secretly converse with her fellow prisoner Terrax. The full extent of her abilities and powers remain undefined and their source unknown.
She's also powerful chaos magic user.

References

External links
 Black Swan of Earth-1365 at Marvel Wiki
 Black Swan (mutant) at Marvel Appendix

Comics characters introduced in 2002
Comics characters introduced in 2013
Characters created by Gail Simone
Characters created by Jonathan Hickman
Characters created by Steve Epting
Marvel Comics characters with superhuman strength
Marvel Comics mutants
Marvel Comics supervillains
Fictional mercenaries in comics
Fictional murderers
Marvel Comics telepaths
Marvel Comics female supervillains
Fictional characters from Altbayern